Bartlett High School may refer to:

 Bartlett High School (Alaska)
 Bartlett High School (Illinois)
 Bartlett High School (Massachusetts), a school in Webster, Massachusetts
 Bartlett High School (Tennessee) 
 Bartlett High School (Texas) 
 Bartlett High School (Connecticut) (1855–1873)

See also
 Bartlett School (disambiguation)